A cast recording by the original Broadway cast of the musical Cats was released on January 26, 1983, by Geffen Records. The recording won Best Cast Show Album at the 26th Annual Grammy Awards.

Track listing
All tracks written by T. S. Eliot and Andrew Lloyd Webber, with any additional writers noted.

The third track on Disc 2 is incorrectly listed as containing "The Ballad of Billy McCaw," a duet based on an unpublished poem by Eliot that was used in the original London production. It actually contains a parody of Italian opera titled "In Una Tepida Notte," which replaced "Ballad" in the original Broadway run and was incorporated into all other US and UK productions of Cats until the removal of "Growltiger's Last Stand" in 2016.

"The Awefull Battle of the Pekes and the Pollicles," a song describing a fight between two tribes of dogs, is not included in this recording. It originally appeared between "Old Deuteronomy" and "The Jellicle Ball" in Act One, then was moved to Act Two to replace "Growltiger's Last Stand" after the latter song was cut.

Development and release
The original Broadway cast of Cats, including the understudies, recorded the album in October 1982. Lloyd Webber flew in from London to oversee the recording, which was estimated to cost as much as $400,000.

The recording was released on January 26, 1983, in two versions: a two-record/disc/cassette complete set, and a one-record/disc/cassette highlights version.

Reception

Critical reception
Matthew Murray gave the recording four out of five stars, praising the orchestration and the cast's performance, particularly Betty Buckley's rendition of "Memory". However, he was wary of "the unconvincing Brit[ish] accents and American vocal mannerisms." The recording also received favorable reviews from the Star Tribune and the Times Colonist.

Commercial performance
The album was certified Platinum by the Recording Industry Association of America on December 5, 1988. According to Playbill, it has sold over 2 million copies and is the 16th-best-selling cast recording in the United States of all time.

Accolades
The recording won Best Cast Show Album at the 26th Annual Grammy Awards.

Weekly charts

References

1983 soundtrack albums
Cast recordings
Geffen Records soundtracks
Theatre soundtracks
Andrew Lloyd Webber albums
Cats (musical)
Grammy Award for Best Musical Theater Album